Vukan of Serbia may refer to:

 Vukan I of Serbia, founder of the Vukanović dynasty, Grand Prince of Serbia from 1080 to 1112
 Vukan II of Serbia, from the Nemanjić dynasty, Grand Prince of Serbia from 1202 to 1204

See also
 Principality of Serbia (disambiguation)